Reading Creek is a tributary of the West Branch Neshaminy Creek, within New Britain Township, Bucks County, Pennsylvania.

New Britain Township developed Lexington Park, a natural resource park, along the creek for recreation. It is located along the Reading Creek Greenway, which run from the streams confluence with the West Branch Neshaminy Creek north through New Britain.

Course

Crossings and Bridges

See also
List of rivers of Pennsylvania
List of rivers of the United States
List of Delaware River tributaries

References

Rivers of Bucks County, Pennsylvania
Tributaries of the Neshaminy Creek